The Finance Minister of the Czech Republic is the head of the Ministry of Finance of the Czech Republic which is concerned with financial and monetary matters.

The Finance Minister is a member of Prime Minister's Cabinet and is allowed to attend meetings of the National Security Council of the Czech Republic.

The current Finance Minister of the Czech Republic is Zbyněk Stanjura, in office since 17 December 2021.

List of Finance Ministers of the Czech Republic

References

Politics of the Czech Republic
Government ministers of the Czech Republic